Empire Burton was a  CAM Ship which was built in 1941 for the Ministry of War Transport (MoWT).

Description
Empire Burton was built by Short Brothers Ltd, Pallion for the MoWT. She was yard number 466. Empire Burton was launched on 29 May 1941 and completed in August 1941.

The engine was built by North East Marine Engine Works, Newcastle upon Tyne.

Career
Empire Burton had a short career. She was completed in August 1941 and placed under the management of Common Brothers Ltd, Newcastle upon Tyne. Her port of registry was Sunderland. Empire Burton was a member of two convoys.

ON 9
Convoy ON 9 departed from Milford Haven  on 19 August 1941 and Liverpool on 20 August. It dispersed at sea on 25 August. Empire Burton was bound for Halifax, Nova Scotia.

SC 44
Convoy SC 44 departed from Halifax, calling at Sydney from where the convoy departed on 11 September bound for Liverpool. At 01:13 (German time) on 20 September 1941,  fired four torpedoes, one of which hit Empire Burton and sank her with the loss of two of the 60 crew. The ship was east of Cape Farewell at the time. Those lost on Empire Burton are commemorated at the Tower Hill Memorial, London.

Official Numbers and Code Letters

Official Numbers were a forerunner to IMO Numbers. Empire Burton had the United Kingdom Official Number 168915 and used the Code Letters BCMR.

References

1941 ships
Ships built on the River Wear
CAM ships
Empire ships
Ministry of War Transport ships
Steamships of the United Kingdom
Ships sunk by German submarines in World War II
Shipwrecks in the Atlantic Ocean
Maritime incidents in September 1941